Scapa Flow is a 1930 German drama film directed by Leo Lasko and starring Otto Gebühr, Claire Rommer and Claus Clausen. It is set around the Wilhelmshaven Mutiny and the Scuttling of the German fleet in Scapa Flow at the close of the First World War. In Weimar Germany the scuttling of the fleet in defiance of the victorious Allies had come to be seen as a popular patriotic act. The inclusion of the Mutiny, however, was more controversial as it highlighted the political divisions which continued to exist. The film was praised by the right wing press, and comparisons were made to the Russian film Battleship Potemkin. The film was partly inspired by the 1918 play Seeschalt by Reinhardt Goering.

Cast
 Otto Gebühr   
 Claus Clausen   
 Claire Rommer 
 Erna Morena
 Aribert Mog   
 Arthur Duarte   
 Carl Balhaus   
 Heinz Klockow

References

Bibliography
 Kester, Bernadette. Film Front Weimar: Representations of the First World War in German films of the Weimar Period (1919-1933). Amsterdam University Press, 2003.

External links

1930 films
German war drama films
1930s German-language films
Films directed by Léo Lasko
Films of the Weimar Republic
Films set in 1918
Films set in 1919
Films set in Scotland
German World War I films
World War I films based on actual events
German black-and-white films
1930s war drama films
1930 drama films
1930s German films